Keenan Cahill (1995 – December 29, 2022) was an American YouTuber and Internet celebrity who gained fame in the early 2010s for his viral videos in which he lip synced to popular songs.

Cahill launched his first lipsynced YouTube video on August 28, 2010, on the Katy Perry song "Teenage Dream". Guest artists on his channel included Jennifer Aniston, 50 Cent, Flo Rida, Katy Perry, Tinie Tempah, Maroon 5, Cody Simpson, Jason Derulo, Big Time Rush, Glee, The Wanted, LMFAO, Drake Bell, Justin Bieber, Gym Class Heroes, Xuso Jones, WWE wrestler The Miz, and Pauly D. He released two EPs and over a dozen singles on iTunes.

Early life 
Cahill was born in 1995 in Elmhurst, Illinois. Cahill was treated with a bone marrow transplant in 1997 to slow down the progression of the disease, and he had multiple surgeries, including surgery to relieve intracranial pressure.

Career

2011
In March, at a Danish award show, TV 2 Zulu Awards 2011, Cahill performed in a video where he was lip-synching the songs which were nominated for the Hit of the Year award. In April, he appeared with Brian Wilson and Cody Ross of the San Francisco Giants performing Taio Cruz's hit, "Dynamite". During her California Dreams Tour, Katy Perry met Keenan and they performed "Teenage Dream" together in a video. Cahill was nominated for Viral Web Star at the J-14 Awards in September. In the fall, he performed in a music video with The Oak Ridge Boys for their song "What'cha Gonna Do". A one-hour documentary about Cahill aired on NT1 in France, Belgium and Switzerland.

2012–2022
Cahill released 18 singles and two EPs through iTunes.

Death
Cahill died at age 27 on December 29, 2022, following open-heart surgery on December 15.

Discography

EPs
 Hands Up (The Dance Remixes) (feat. ElectroVamp) (Augmenter Publishing Group, April 2012)
 Closer (The Remixes) (feat. SHY & DRS) (Augmenter Music Group / PressPlay, February 2014)

Singles
 "Hands Up" (feat. ElectroVamp) (Augmenter Publishing Group, July 2012)
 "Closer" (feat. SHY & DRS) (Augmenter Music Group / PressPlay, November 2013)
 "Back to Us" (feat. Lovey James) (PressPlay, March 2014)
 "Till Morning Comes" (feat. Kristina Antuna)  (Keenan Cahill, May 2017)

References

1995 births
2022 deaths
American Internet celebrities
Viral videos
People from Chicago
21st-century American people
Date of birth missing
People from Elmhurst, Illinois